Frank William Smith (13 October 1897 – July 1988) was an English footballer. He started playing competitive football as an inside forward, but converted to a wing half during his Football League career.

Smith started his football career in the town of his birth with Kettering Town, before Watford paid a fee of £125 for his services in March 1921. He remained at the Hertfordshire-based club for the rest of his career, making 319 appearances in the Football League, and a further 22 in the FA Cup. Following his retirement from football in 1932, Smith remained in Hertfordshire, and became a bus driver. He died in July 1988 in St Albans, aged 90.

References

1897 births
1988 deaths
English footballers
English Football League players
Kettering Town F.C. players
Watford F.C. players
Association football inside forwards
Association football wing halves